Za trochu lásky... is a Czech novel, written by František Kožík and published in 1997. The story revolves around the life and relationships of 19th-century poet and playwright, Jaroslav Vrchlický.

The book's title (For a little love...) is taken from one of Vrchlický's poems.

Biographical novels
1997 Czech novels